Lawrence Chapman (25 June 1928 – 29 January 2008) was an Australian cricketer. He played in seven first-class matches for Queensland between 1949 and 1952.

See also
 List of Queensland first-class cricketers

References

External links
 

1928 births
2008 deaths
Australian cricketers
Queensland cricketers
Cricketers from Brisbane